Uzay may refer to:

 Uzay Heparı (1969-1994), Turkish composer, music producer, songwriter and actor
 Uzay-le-Venon, commune in the Cher département of the Centre region of France
 Uzair, figure mentioned in the Quran